Hypotrachyna bogotensis is a species of foliose lichen in the family Parmeliaceae. It was first described scientifically by Finnish lichenologist Edvard August Vainio. Mason Hale transferred it to the genus Hypotrachyna in 1975. It is a common species in the high mountains of the Central America and the northern Andes. It has also been recorded from southern Chile and from Gough Island.

References

bogotensis
Lichen species
Lichens described in 1899
Lichens of Central America
Lichens of South America
Taxa named by Edvard August Vainio